Thomas Charles Edward Ecclesine (October 19, 1846 in Dublin, Ireland – December 12, 1895 in New York City, USA) was an American lawyer and politician from New York.

Life
The family emigrated to the United States when Thomas was ten years old, and settled in New York City. He graduated from Columbia College in 1870, and from Columbia Law School in 1871. He was Wheeler H. Peckham's managing clerk during the Tweed Ring trials.

Ecclesine was a member of the New York State Assembly (New York Co., 19th D.) in 1877.

He was a member of the New York State Senate (8th D.) in 1878 and 1879.

He died at his home at 102 West 128th Street on December 12, 1895, of "diabetes and heart trouble," and was buried at St. Raymond's Cemetery, now in The Bronx.

Sources
 Civil List and Constitutional History of the Colony and State of New York compiled by Edgar Albert Werner (1884; pg. 290 and 377)
 The State Government for 1879 by Charles G. Shanks (Weed, Parsons & Co, Albany NY, 1879; pg. 53)
 A SOUTH AMERICAN BRIDE in NYT on November 30, 1887
 OBITUARY RECORD; Thomas Charles Edward Ecclesine in NYT on December 13, 1895
 FUNERAL OF THOMAS C. E. ECCLESINE in NYT on December 15, 1895

1846 births
1895 deaths
Democratic Party New York (state) state senators
Politicians from New York City
Columbia Law School alumni
Democratic Party members of the New York State Assembly
Irish emigrants to the United States (before 1923)
19th-century American politicians
Lawyers from New York City
Burials at Saint Raymond's Cemetery (Bronx)
Columbia College (New York) alumni
19th-century American lawyers